The Anantara Hua Hin Resort & Spa in Hua Hin, Thailand a resort property of the Anantara Hotels, Resorts & Spas group, owned and managed by Minor International which owns over 100 hotels and resorts in several countries the Anantara brand., The resort has 187 rooms and suites, five restaurants, four bars and various leisure facilities.

History 

The resort was built in 2001, the first resort developed under the Anantara brand name.

The overall design and architecture of Anantara Hua Hin Resort & Spa were carried out by the designer, Bill Bensley who has been credited with designing a majority of Anantara’s hotels and resorts.

Awards

2014 
Award of Excellence for ‘Baan Thalia’ Italian Restaurant – Wine Inspector
Thailand Tatler Best Restaurants Award for ‘Baan Thalia’ Italian Restaurant

2013 

Award of Excellence for ‘Baan Thalia’ Italian Restaurant – Wine Inspector
World’s Leading Green Resort
Asia’s Leading Green Resort
Thailand Tourism Award for Anantara Spa

2012 

Gold Circle Award – Agoda

Partnerships 
Anantara Hua Hin Resort & Spa is part of the Kiwi Collection of Anantara Hotels, Resorts & Spas, and is a member of the Global Hotel Alliance.

Its parent company, Anantara Hotels Resorts & Spas, supports and contributes to the King's Cup Elephant Polo tournament in Bangkok.

Charity work

Anantara Hua Hin Resort & Spa has donated to a project for the autistic school in Petchaburi Province, and awards the Roy E. Scholarship for needy children in schools at Petchaburi and Hua Hin.

References 

Resorts in Thailand